Smolyaninovo is an urban locality (an urban-type settlement) and the administrative center of Shkotovsky District of Primorsky Krai, Russia, located  from Vladivostok;  by road. Population:

History
It became the administrative center of Shkotovsky District in 2004.

References

Urban-type settlements in Primorsky Krai